The CANSA FC.20 was a twin engine reconnaissance bomber/ground attack monoplane designed and built in Italy in 1941. Several versions with different armament and engines were flown but only the FC.20bis ground attack variant reached squadron service, in very small numbers, before the 1943 armistice.

Design and development
The FC.20 was originally intended as a reconnaissance bomber but was developed instead as a ground attack aircraft. The first prototype first flew on 12 April 1941, piloted by Moroni. Four variants were structurally and aerodynamically similar apart from the front fuselage detail and engine installations.

The FC.20 was a cantilever low wing monoplane with a straight tapered wing of aspect ratio about 6.4. The leading edge was almost unswept and the tips rounded. The wing had positive dihedral outboard of the engines. The trailing edges carried short span, tabbed ailerons and split flaps which reached past the lower engine fairings to the wing roots. The twin engines were mounted forward of the leading edge with the propeller shaft in the wing plane; the mainwheels of the conventional undercarriage retracted backwards into the extended underwing engine fairings. The FC.20 had a twin tail, with elliptically shaped endplate vertical surfaces almost equally divided vertically between fin and rudder. These were mounted on a tapered tailplane with significant dihedral, carrying tabbed, tapered elevators. The rear fuselage extended beyond the empennage, providing a housing for the retractable talwheel.

In the unarmed reconnaissance bomber first prototype FC.20, the side-by-side cockpit was placed above the wing leading edge. A long glazed nose extended forwards from the cockpit to beyond the plane of the propellers.

The second, ground attack FC.20bis prototype differed chiefly from the first in having a shortened nose, a cockpit placed ahead of the wing leading edge and full armament, though there was also a slight increase in wing area. The solid nose contained a 37 mm (1.46 in) Breda cannon, supplemented by a pair of 12.7 mm (0.5 in) machine guns in the wing roots. An enclosed, rotating dorsal turret to the rear of the cockpit but still over the wing contained a similar machine gun. Two 160 kg (352 lb) bombs could be released from external wing mountings and small bombs from within the fuselage.

Two other variants also flew, both distinguished chiefly by their engines. The FC.20ter was a modification of the FC.20 with 745 kW (1,000 hp) Fiat A.80 R.C.41 radials. Unlike the FC.20, this aircraft had the dorsal turret of the FC.20bis and a nose-mounted, long-barrelled cannon. The sole FC.20quater was one of the few production FC.20bis aircraft, re-engined with 935 kW (1,250 hp) Daimler-Benz DB 601 V-12, liquid-cooled motors. It was fitted with a 37 mm (1.46 in) Mauser Ikaria cannon and a pair of 20 mm (0.79 in) cannon replaced the wing root machine guns of the FC.20bis. Tested in 1943, it flew higher and 80 kmh (50 mph) faster than the FC.20bis.

Operational history
A few production FC.20bis were built, and it is known that three served the 174a Squadriglia Ricognizione Strategica in July 1943 but were not used operationally. Italian military operations ceased with the armistice of September 1943.

Variants

FC.20 First prototype, long nose reconnaissance version.  
FC.20bis Short nose ground attack version. Dorsal turret.
FC.20ter As FC.20 with 745 kW (1,000 hp) Fiat A.80 R.C.41 twin row 18-cylinder radial engines. Dorsal turret.
FC.20quater As FC.20bis with 935 kW (1,250 hp) Daimler-Benz DB 601 inverted V-12 engines. Dorsal turret.

Units using this aircraft
174a Squadriglia Ricognizione Strategica (174th Strategic Reconnaissance Squadron).

Specifications (FC.20bis)

See also

References

Sources

 Angelucci, Enzo. The Rand McNally Encyclopedia of Military Aircraft, 1914-1980. San Diego, California: The Military Press, 1983.  .
 Thompson, Jonathan. Italian Civil and Military Aircraft 1930–1945. Fallbrook, CaliforniaAero Publishers, Inc, 1963.

FC.20
1940s Italian attack aircraft
Low-wing aircraft
Aircraft first flown in 1941
Twin piston-engined tractor aircraft